Neduba propsti, known generally as the Catalina shield-back cricket or Propst's shieldback, is a species of shield-backed katydid in the family Tettigoniidae. It is found in North America.

References

Further reading

 
 

Tettigoniinae
Articles created by Qbugbot
Insects described in 1981